Steven Roy Howe (March 10, 1958 – April 28, 2006) was an American professional baseball relief pitcher. He played 12 seasons in Major League Baseball (MLB) for the Los Angeles Dodgers, Minnesota Twins, Texas Rangers and New York Yankees, spanning 1980 to 1996. His baseball career ended in 1997 after a stint with the Sioux Falls Canaries of the independent Northern League.

A hard-throwing left-hander, Howe was the Rookie of the Year in 1980, saved the clinching game of the 1981 World Series, and was an All-Star in 1982.  However, his career was derailed by problems with alcohol and cocaine abuse.  He was suspended seven times by Major League Baseball for drug-policy violations, and in 1992 he received a lifetime ban from baseball that he was able to overturn with an appeal. After each disciplinary action, he returned to show flashes of his former brilliance. He died in a single-vehicle accident in 2006, after which an autopsy identified the presence of methamphetamine in his system.

Baseball career
Born in Pontiac, Michigan, Howe played college baseball at the University of Michigan in Ann Arbor and was a two-time All-Big Ten selection. He saved 17 games during his ROY season, establishing a new rookie record. In the following strike-shortened season, Howe helped the Dodgers win the World Series over the New York Yankees.

Over the course of his 17-year career, Howe was suspended seven times.

After briefly pitching for the Minnesota Twins and Texas Rangers and being out of the major leagues for four years, Howe signed with the Yankees, where he once again pitched effectively. He failed to repeat the performance the following year and was relegated to a setup role, and was released in June  after posting an 0–1 record with a 6.35 ERA. Howe finished his career in 1997 playing with the Sioux Falls Canaries of the independent Northern League.

For his career, Howe posted a record of 47 wins, 41 losses, 91 saves, and a 3.03 ERA in 497 games.

Autobiography
Howe published an autobiography in 1989, the middle of his baseball career. The book, Between the Lines: One Athlete's Struggle to Escape the Nightmare of Addiction, described his chemical dependency and hope for recovery based upon his newfound commitment to evangelical Christianity. The book was co-written with Jim Greenfield, a lawyer from the Philadelphia area.

After baseball
Following his retirement from baseball, Howe worked in Lake Havasu City, Arizona, as a self-employed framing contractor. His company's name was All Star Framing.

On April 28, 2006, Howe's pickup truck rolled over in Coachella, California, and he was killed. He was not wearing a seat belt at the time of the crash. The toxicology reports following his autopsy indicated he had methamphetamine in his system.

See also
List of people banned from Major League Baseball

Published works

References

External links

Ex-MLB pitcher Howe dies in truck crash, MSNBC.com

1958 births
2006 deaths
Major League Baseball pitchers
Major League Baseball players suspended for drug offenses
Major League Baseball Rookie of the Year Award winners
National League All-Stars
Albany-Colonie Yankees players
American sportspeople convicted of crimes
Columbus Clippers players
Los Angeles Dodgers players
Michigan Wolverines baseball players
Minnesota Twins players
New York Yankees players
San Antonio Dodgers players
San Jose Bees players
Oklahoma City 89ers players
Salinas Spurs players
Sioux Falls Canaries players
Texas Rangers players
Baseball players from Michigan
People from Santa Clarita, California
Sportspeople from Pontiac, Michigan
Drugs in sport in the United States
Road incident deaths in California
People from Lake Havasu City, Arizona
Anchorage Glacier Pilots players